The 4th New York State Legislature, consisting of the New York State Senate and the New York State Assembly, met from September 7, 1780, to July 1, 1781, during the fourth year of George Clinton's governorship, first at Poughkeepsie, then at Albany, and finally at Poughkeepsie again.

Background
Under the provisions of the New York Constitution of 1777, the State Senators were elected on general tickets in the senatorial districts, and were then divided into four classes. Six senators each drew lots for a term of 1, 2, 3 or 4 years and, beginning at the election in April 1778, every year six Senate seats came up for election to a four-year term. Assemblymen were elected countywide on general tickets to a one-year term, the whole assembly being renewed annually.

On May 8, 1777, the Constitutional Convention had appointed the senators from the Southern District, and the assemblymen from Kings, New York, Queens, Richmond and Suffolk counties—the area which was under British control—and determined that these appointees serve in the Legislature until elections could be held in those areas, presumably after the end of the American Revolutionary War. Vacancies among the appointed members in the Senate should be filled by the Assembly, and vacancies in the Assembly by the Senate.

Elections
The State elections were held from April 25 to 27, 1780. Gov. George Clinton and Lt. Gov. Pierre Van Cortlandt were re-elected. Under the determination by the Constitutional Convention, the senators William Floyd, William Smith and Isaac Stoutenburgh, whose seats were up for election, continued in office, as well as the assemblymen from Kings, New York, Queens, Richmond and Suffolk counties. Arthur Parks (Middle D.) was re-elected. Philip Schuyler was elected in the Western District. Assemblyman Elkanah Day, from Cumberland County, which had seceded from New York to become a part of the Vermont Republic, was elected in the Eastern District.

Sessions

The State Legislature met first in Poughkeepsie, the seat of Dutchess County, on September 7, 1780, and adjourned on October 10. The Legislature reconvened at the Old City Hall in Albany, the seat of Albany County, on January 17, 1781, and adjourned on March 31. The Legislature reconvened again in Poughkeepsie, the Senate on June 15, the Assembly on June 18, and adjourned finally on July 1.

State Senate

Districts
The Southern District (9 seats) consisted of Kings, New York, Queens, Richmond, Suffolk and Westchester counties.
The Middle District (6 seats) consisted of Dutchess, Orange and Ulster counties.
The Eastern District (3 seats) consisted of Charlotte, Cumberland and Gloucester counties.
The Western District (6 seats) consisted of Albany and Tryon counties.

Note: There are now 62 counties in the State of New York. The counties which are not mentioned in this list had not yet been established, or sufficiently organized, the area being included in one or more of the abovementioned counties. In 1784, Charlotte Co. was renamed Washington Co., and Tryon Co. was renamed Montgomery Co.

Senators
The asterisk (*) denotes members of the previous Legislature who continued in office as members of this Legislature. Elkanah Day changed from the Assembly to the Senate, but never took his seat.

Employees
Clerk: Robert Benson

State Assembly

Districts

The City and County of Albany (10 seats)
Charlotte County (4 seats)
Cumberland County (3 seats)
Dutchess County (7 seats)
Gloucester County (2 seats)
Kings County (2 seats)
The City and County of New York (9 seats)
Orange County (4 seats)
Queens County (4 seats)
Richmond County (2 seats)
Suffolk County (5 seats)
Tryon County (6 seats)
Ulster County (6 seats)
Westchester County (6 seats)

Note: There are now 62 counties in the State of New York. The counties which are not mentioned in this list had not yet been established, or sufficiently organized, the area being included in one or more of the abovementioned counties. In 1784, Charlotte Co. was renamed Washington Co., and Tryon Co. was renamed Montgomery Co.

Assemblymen
The asterisk (*) denotes members of the previous Legislature who continued as members of this Legislature.

Employees
Clerk: John McKesson

Notes

Sources
The New York Civil List compiled by Franklin Benjamin Hough (Weed, Parsons and Co., 1858) [see pg. 108 for Senate districts; pg. 111 for senators; pg. 148f for Assembly districts; pg. 159f for assemblymen]

1780 in New York (state)
1781 in New York (state)
004